Elderberry Forebay Dam is a dam located in the Sierra Pelona Mountains of northwestern Los Angeles County, California.
The dam partitions Elderberry Forebay from Castaic Lake. 
It forms the headwater reservoir for Castaic Power Plant, a pumped-storage hydroelectricity generation facility.
The dam was completed in 1974 as part of the California State Water Project.

See also
 California State Water Project

References

Dams in Los Angeles County, California
California Department of Water Resources dams
California State Water Project
Earth-filled dams
Sierra Pelona Ridge
Dams completed in 1974